Muhammad Hussain Mehanti is a Pakistani politician and Ameer of Jamaat-e-Islami Sindh. Hussain also served as Member of the National Assembly from 2002 to 2007.

References 

Living people
1946 births
University of Karachi alumni
Jamaat-e-Islami Pakistan politicians
Pakistani MNAs 2002–2007